Daniel Anthony Sam (born 13 August 1981) is an English super heavyweight kickboxer and is currently ranked UK number 1 in the heavyweight division of Muay Thai. He has fought on the top kickboxing promotions including Enfusion, SUPERKOMBAT, Glory and most recently Dynamite Fighting Show. Sam is known for his flying knees, devastating low kicks and strong punches.

Kickboxing career
In September 2017 Sam fought on the Phoenix Championship 3 event at the o2 arena, London. In a fight under full Muay Thai rules, he beat Steven 'the Panda' Banks via TKO in the 3rd round.

In a rematch versus Tomáš Možný on Fight Night St. Tropez (August 2017), Sam avenged a loss suffered a year earlier on the same event, winning by unanimous decision against the GLORY kickboxing world ranked no.10 heavyweight.

Sam won the Capital Fights French Federation title with a unanimous decision win over Nordine Mahieddine in Paris (May 2017).

In March 2017, Sam won the Enfusion Live Abu Dhabi tournament with two wins in one night and captured the fighter of the night award. In the semi-final he beat Moroccan heavyweight Yassin Ben Sallam via unanimous decision. In the tournament final Sam faced GLORY ranked no.15 Thomas Vanneste from Belgium and won with a devastating 3rd round knockout.

In November 2016 Sam faced Patrice Quarteron in a highly anticipated grudge match in Paris, winning by unanimous decision in front of a large crowd in November 2017.  The fight and the result gained worldwide popularity due to the hostile build up and bad blood between both fighters. Top French rapper Booba subsequently recorded a song titled Daniel Sam in which he celebrates Sam's victory.

Puerto Rico hosted the SUPERKOMBAT kickboxing event in March 2016 with Sam taking on Catalin Morasanu the hard punching and very popular Southpaw Romanian heavyweight.
Sam won via a controversial split decision.

Enfusion reality tournament season 4 (Search for the superpro) took place in Koh Samui, Thailand in Sep 2013. Sam faced 4 opponents from Australia, Netherlands, Ivory Coast and Morocco (the last 3 opponents were fought all in a one night tournament). Sam won every fight, the tournament and became the Enfusion Heavyweight World Champion. 

In March 2013 Sam signed with GLORY and defeated Singh Jaideep by way of unanimous decision at Glory 5: London in London, England on 23 March 2013.

In November 2014 Daniel Sam launched his own fitness training company called Daniel Sam Fitness, using martial arts and combat based fitness training. As of 2018 he is coaching out of Diesel Gym London.

Sam faced Marian Tuma for the Immortal Champions Heavyweight Title (+95 kg) at Immortal Champions 3 on June 7, 2022, following a three-year absence from the sport. He won the fight by a first-round technical knockout.

Sam was booked to face the former French national heavyweight boxing champion Raphaël Tronché at Alpha Fight League 2 on November 12, 2022. He lost the fight by a second-round knockout.

Doping suspension

Glory 23
On 7 August 2015 it was announced that Sam failed a drug test prior to Glory 23: Las Vegas. He was suspended and fined by Nevada State Athletic Commission until 8 August 2016. Sam must also submit clean drugs tests for steroids and diuretics at 30, 10 and 3 days before next fight in Nevada.

Championships and accomplishments

Kickboxing
Immortal Champions
2022 Immortal Champions Heavyweight (+95 kg) Championship
Dynamite Fighting Show 
Fight of the Night (One time) vs. Cătălin Moroșanu
Capital Fights
2017 Capital Fights French Federation Heavyweight title 
Enfusion 
2017 Enfusion Live 48 Heavyweight Tournament Champion 
2013 Enfusion 4: Search for the SuperPro Tournament Champion
SUPERKOMBAT 
2012 SUPERKOMBAT World Grand Prix II Tournament Runner-up
Ringmasters 
2007 Ringmasters Heavyweight Tournament Champion

Muaythai
 2009 English Muaythai Super Heavyweight Champion 
 2007 IFMA Muaythai European Cup  +95 kg

Kickboxing record

|-  style="background:#fbb;"
| 2022-11-12 || Loss ||align=left| Raphaël Tronché || Alpha Fight League 2 || Brussels, Belgium || KO || 2 || 
|- 
|-  style="background:#cfc;"
| 2022-06-07 || Win ||align=left| Marian Tuma || Immortal Champions 3 || London, England || TKO (Referee stoppage) || 1 || 
|- 
! style=background:white colspan=9 |
|- 
|-  style="background:#fbb;"
| 2019-06-06|| Loss ||align=left| Cătălin Moroșanu|| Dynamite Fighting Show 4 || Cluj-Napoca, Romania || Decision (Unanimous) || 3|| 3:00
|-  style="background:#fbb;"
| 2019-02-24|| Loss ||align=left| Asihati || Kunlun Fight 80: Heavyweight Tournament, Quarter Finals || China || TKO (Three Knockdowns/Punches) || 2 || 2:10
|-  style="background:#fbb;"
| 2017-12-09 || Loss ||align=left| Yassine Boughanem || Golden Fight || France || Decision (Unanimous) || 3 || 3:00
|-  style="background:#fbb;"
| 2017-11-18 || Loss ||align=left| Michael Smolik|| Steko’s Fight Night Düsseldorf || Germany || Decision (Unanimous) || 5 || 3:00
|- 
! style=background:white colspan=9 |
|-  style="background:#cfc;"
| 2017-09-22 || Win ||align=left| Steven Banks|| Phoenix 3 London || England || TKO (Referee Stoppage/Right Cross) || 3 || 1:00
|-  style="background:#cfc;"
| 2017-08-04 || Win ||align=left| Tomáš Možný || Fight Night Saint-Tropez || France || Decision (Unanimous) || 3 || 3:00
|-  style="background:#cfc;"
| 2017-05-20 || Win ||align=left| Nordine Mahieddine || Capital Fights 2 || Paris, France || Decision || 3 || 3:00
|-
! style=background:white colspan=9 |
|-  style="background:#cfc;"
| 2017-03-24 || Win ||align=left| Thomas Vanneste || Enfusion Live 48 || Abu Dhabi, UAE || KO (Straight right) || 3 || 
|- 
! style=background:white colspan=9 |
|-  style="background:#cfc;"
| 2017-03-24 || Win ||align=left| Yassin Ben Sallam || Enfusion Live 48 || Abu Dhabi, UAE || Decision || 3 || 3:00
|-  style="background:#cfc;"
| 2017-02-18 || Win ||align=left| Fikri Ameziane || Enfusion Live 46 || Eindhoven, Netherlands || KO || 2 ||
|-  style="background:#cfc;"
| 2016-11-24 || Win ||align=left| Patrice Quarteron || Paris Fight 2 || Paris, France || Decision || 3 || 3:00
|-  style="background:#fbb;"
| 2016-08-04 || Loss ||align=left| Tomáš Možný || Fight Night Saint Tropez, Semi Finals || France || Decision || 3 || 3:00
|-  style="background:#cfc;"
| 2016-07-02 || Win ||align=left| Vladimir Toktasynov || Respect World Series 2 || London, England || Decision (Unanimous) || 3 || 3:00   
|-  style="background:#cfc;"
| 2016-03-26 || Win ||align=left| Cătălin Moroșanu || SUPERKOMBAT World Grand Prix I 2016 || San Juan, Puerto Rico || Decision (split) || 3 || 3:00
|-  style="background:#fbb;"
| 2015-08-07 || Loss ||align=left| Xavier Vigney || Glory 23: Las Vegas || Las Vegas, Nevada, USA || Decision (split) || 3 || 3:00
|-  style="background:#cfc;"
| 2015-06-13 || Win ||align=left| Brian Douwes || SUPERKOMBAT Special Edition || Spreitenbach, Switzerland || Decision (Split) || 3 || 3:00
|-  style="background:#fbb;"
| 2014-09-23 || Loss ||align=left| Lukasz Krupadziorow || Enfusion 5: Victory of the Vixen, Semi Finals || Koh Samui, Thailand || Decision || 3 || 3:00
|-  style="background:#fbb;"
| 2014-06-29 || Loss ||align=left| Ismael Lazaar || Enfusion Live 19 || London, England || KO (left hook) || 3 || 0:40
|-
! style=background:white colspan=9 |
|-  style="background:#fbb;"
| 2014-05-03 || Loss ||align=left| Benjamin Adegbuyi || Glory 16: Denver || Broomfield, Colorado, USA || KO (right cross) || 2 || 2:59
|-  style="background:#fbb;"
| 2013-11-23 || Loss ||align=left| Nicolas Wamba || La 20ème Nuit des Champions || Marseilles, France || Decision (Unanimous) || 3 || 3:00
|-
! style=background:white colspan=9 |
|-  style="background:#fbb;"
| 2013-10-12 || Loss ||align=left| Sergei Kharitonov || Glory 11: Chicago || Hoffman Estates, Illinois, USA || Decision (0-3) || 3 || 3:00 
|-  style="background:#cfc;"
| 2013-09-17 || Win||align=left| Mo Boubkari || Enfusion 4: Search for the SuperPro, Finals || Koh Samui, Thailand || Decision (3-0) || 3 || 3:00
|-
! style=background:white colspan=9 |
|-  style="background:#cfc;"
| 2013-09-17 || Win||align=left| Kirk Krouba || Enfusion 4: Search for the SuperPro, Semi Finals || Koh Samui, Thailand || Decision (2-1) || 3 || 3:00
|-  style="background:#cfc;"
| 2013-09-17 || Win||align=left| Wendell Roche || Enfusion 4: Search for the SuperPro, Quarter Finals || Koh Samui, Thailand || Decision (3-0) || 3 || 3:00
|-  style="background:#cfc;"
| 2013-09-12 || Win||align=left| Iggy McGowan || Enfusion 4: Search for the SuperPro, First Round || Koh Samui, Thailand || Decision (3-0) || 3 || 3:00
|-  style="background:#fbb;"
| 2013-06-22 || Loss ||align=left| Anderson Silva || Glory 9: New York || New York City, New York, USA || Decision (0-3) || 3 || 3:00
|-  style="background:#cfc;"
| 2013-03-23 || Win ||align=left| Singh Jaideep || Glory 5: London || London, England || Decision (3-0) || 3 || 3:00 
|-  style="background:#cfc;"
| 2012-12-22 || Win ||align=left| Ibrahim Aarab || SUPERKOMBAT WGP 2012 Final || Bucharest, Romania || Decision (2-1)|| 3 || 3:00
|-  style="background:#fbb;"
| 2012-11-10 || Loss ||align=left| Ismael Londt || SUPERKOMBAT WGP 2012 Final Elimination, Quarter Finals || Craiova, Romania || TKO (doctor stoppage) || 1 || 
|-  style="background:#fbb;"
| 2012-05-12 || Loss ||align=left| Raul Cătinaș || SUPERKOMBAT WGP II 2012, Finals || Cluj Napoca, Romania || Decision (0-3) || 3 || 3:00
|-
! style=background:white colspan=9 |
|-  style="background:#cfc;"
| 2012-05-12 || Win ||align=left| Sam Tevette || SUPERKOMBAT WGP II 2012, Semi Finals || Cluj Napoca, Romania || KO || 1 || 1:30
|-  style="background:#fbb;"
| 2012-03-31 || Loss ||align=left| Tomáš Hron || Gala night Thaiboxing || Zilina, Slovakia || Decision (0-3) || 3 || 3:00
|-  style="background:#fbb;"
| 2011-11-17 || Loss ||align=left| Ben Edwards || SUPERKOMBAT Fight Club, Quarter Finals || Oradea, Romania || TKO (referee stoppage) || 2 || 2:43
|-  style="background:#cfc;"
| 2011-06-19 || Win ||align=left| Thanasis Michaloudis || Team Tieu's Super Muay Thai Championships  || London, England || TKO (kicks to the body) || 3 || 
|-  style="background:#fbb;"
| 2011-03-12 || Loss ||align=left| Luca Panto || Fight Code: Dragon Series Round 2 || Milan, Italy || Decision || 3 || 3:00
|-  style="background:#cfc;"
| 2010-05-29 || Win ||align=left| Alessio Valentini || MSA Muaythai Premier League 3 || London, England || KO || 1 || 1:22
|-  style="background:#fbb;"
| 2009-05-24 || Loss ||align=left| Dillian Whyte || || London, England || ||  || 
|-  style="background:#cfc;"
| 2009-03-01 || Win ||align=left| Arunas Andriveskius || || Luton, England || KO (punch) ||  || 
|-
! style=background:white colspan=9 |
|-  style="background:#cfc;"
| 2009-02-07 || Win ||align=left| Chris Knowles || || London, England || Decision || 3 || 3:00
|-  style="background:#cfc;"
| 2008-12-07 || Win ||align=left| Lyndon Knowles || || London, England || ||  || 
|-  style="background:#cfc;"
| 2007-00-00 || Win ||align=left| Mark Fuller || Ringmasters, Finals || Manchester, England || TKO (lowkick) || 1 || 
|-
! style=background:white colspan=9 |
|-  style="background:#cfc;"
| 2007-00-00 || Win ||align=left| Matt Scott || Ringmasters, Semi Finals || Manchester, England || Decision  || 2 || 
|-  style="background:#cfc;"
| 2007-00-00 || Win ||align=left| Theo Thedoulou || Ringmasters, Quarter Finals || Manchester, England || Decision || 2 || 
|-  style="background:#cfc;"
| 2007-00-00 || Win ||align=left| Lee Stewart || || Manchester, England || KO (punch) || 1 || 
|-  style="background:#cfc;"
||| Win ||align=left| Will Riva || || || KO (flying knee) || ||
|-
| colspan=9 | Legend:

See also 
List of male kickboxers

References

External links 
Mike's Gym official site
Diesel Gym London

1981 births
Living people
English male kickboxers
English Muay Thai practitioners
Heavyweight kickboxers
Glory kickboxers
SUPERKOMBAT kickboxers
Doping cases in kickboxing
English sportspeople in doping cases
Sportspeople from London
Black British sportsmen